is a Japanese actor, chef, TV presenter, entrepreneur, and model.

Hayami is of Filipino descent; he is specifically a quarter Filipino, as his mother is Filipino-Japanese.

Biography
Hayami debuted in 2002 with the television series You're Under Arrest, and came to fame with Gokusen 2 in 2005. Hayami has appeared in popular TV dramas like Densha Otoko, Tokyo Tower, Zettai Kareshi (Absolute Boyfriend, as Night Tenjo), Shinzanmono, Kinkyū Torishirabeshitsu and 5-ji Kara 9-ji Made. He also featured in numerous TV commercials such as Daihatsu Tanto, Bourbon Petit, au by KDDI, Suntory, Nissin Foods, P&G, Kirin and Oji Nepia. He was the spokesperson for the fashion brand Edwin from 2006 to 2010.

Besides his acting career, Hayami is also well known for his cooking skills, especially after he starred as the host of Moco's Kitchen  - a popular NTV show since 2011 and its spin-off, Mocomichi's Midnight Kitchen. He has his own line of kitchen utensils called Mocomichi Hayami and has published a series of cookbooks, including Love Meat (2015), Love Gohan (2016) and Love Pizza & Bread (2018). He won the 2013 Gourmand World Cookbook Award for Best Japanese Cookbook in Paris, France.

In July 2019, Hayami started an official YouTube channel called M's Table where he posts his original food recipes.

Filmography

TV dramas

Movies

TV shows & events

Books

Personal life

Relationships
On August 8, 2019, Hayami and actress Aya Hirayama were married in an intimate ceremony attended only by family and close friends. The wedding reception took place in a private banquet hall in Tokyo.

References

External links
 
 Official Profile
 Moco's Kitchen 
 Mocomichi Hayami Official Shop
 

1984 births
Japanese people of Filipino descent
Japanese male actors of Filipino descent
Male actors from Tokyo
Living people
People from Tokyo
Ken-On artists
Japanese chefs
Japanese male models